Robert Edward DeMascio (January 11, 1923 – March 23, 1999) was a United States district judge of the United States District Court for the Eastern District of Michigan. Robert E. DeMascio married Margaret Loftus in 1955, they had three children: Robert Jr., Thomas, and Mary.

Education and career

Born in Coraopolis, Pennsylvania, DeMascio entered in the United States Naval Reserve during World War II, from 1943 to 1946. DeMascio completed his undergraduate degree from Wayne State University in 1948 and then obtained a Bachelor of Laws from Wayne State University Law School in 1951. He was in private practice in Detroit, Michigan from 1951 to 1953. He was an Assistant United States Attorney and Chief of the Criminal Division of the Eastern District of Michigan in Detroit from 1954 to 1961, returning to private practice in Detroit from 1961 to 1966. He was a judge of the Recorder's Court in Detroit from 1967 to 1971.

Federal judicial service

On June 14, 1971, DeMascio was nominated by President Richard Nixon to a seat on the United States District Court for the Eastern District of Michigan vacated by Judge Theodore Levin. DeMascio was confirmed by the United States Senate on July 22, 1971, and received his commission the same day. In 1975, DeMascio took over the complicated desegregation case of Milliken v. Bradley from Judge Roth.  For five years DeMascio worked to enforce desegregation in Detroit schools and a number of court-ordered improvements. He assumed senior status on January 16, 1988. DeMascio served in that capacity until his death on March 23, 1999, in Detroit.

External links
Robert E. DeMascio Papers, Walter P. Reuther Library

Sources
 
 Robert E. DeMascio Papers, Walter P. Reuther Library

1923 births
1999 deaths
Judges of the United States District Court for the Eastern District of Michigan
United States district court judges appointed by Richard Nixon
20th-century American judges
United States Navy sailors
American people of Italian descent
People from Coraopolis, Pennsylvania
Assistant United States Attorneys
United States Navy reservists